Edward Devereux, 11th Viscount Hereford (c. 1710 – 20 August 1760) was a British peer and the 11th Viscount Hereford.

Family and ancestry
He was a son of Arthur Devereux of Nantcribba, Montgomeryshire
(d. 1711) and his second wife Elizabeth Glyn. His maternal grandfather was Richard Glyn of Maesmawr.

Arthur Devereux was a son of Vaughan Devereux of Munlyn (d. 1700) and his wife Mary Fox. His paternal grandparents were George Devereux of Vaynor (d. 1682) and Bridget Price.

George Devereux was a namesake son of Sir George Devereux of Sheldon Hall (d. 1665) and his wife Blanch Ridge. The senior George was a younger brother of Walter Devereux, 5th Viscount Hereford who held the title from 1646 to 1658. The descendants of Walter held the title from 1658 to 1700. A senior line of descendants of Sir George had held the title from 1700 to the death of their last male-line member in 1748. The 11th Viscount then inherited the title as their closest male-line relative.

Walter and George Devereux were both sons of Sir Edward Devereux, 1st Baronet of Castle Bromwich (d. 1622) and his wife Catherine Arden. The Baronet was the fourth son of Walter Devereux, 1st Viscount Hereford by either his first wife Mary Grey or his second wife Margaret Garneys. Walter was created Viscount Hereford in 1550 and held the title until his death in 1556. A senior line of his descendants held the title from 1556 to the death of their last male-line member in 1646.

Mary Grey was a daughter of Thomas Grey, 1st Marquess of Dorset and his second wife Cecilia Bonville, 2nd Baroness Bonville.

Marriage and children
On 13 April 1738, Edward married Catherine Mytton (d.1748). She was a daughter of Richard Mytton of Pontyscowryd and Garth, High Sheriff of Montgomeryshire and Dorothy Wynn. They had at least four children:

Edward Devereux, 12th Viscount Hereford (19 February 1740 - 1 August 1783). 
George Devereux, 13th Viscount Hereford (25 April 1744 - 31 December 1804)
Bridget Devereux (d. 1781). Married Price Jones. 
Catherine Devereux (d. 1814). Married Revd John Acland of Broadclyst.

References

 John Debrett, Debrett's Peerage of England, Scotland, and Ireland (1820)

External links
A listing of the Devereux family
A Profile of him on Ancient Ancestors.net

1710s births
1760 deaths
Edward 11
Place of birth unknown
Place of death unknown
Date of birth unknown
Edward